Public Citizen is a non-profit, progressive consumer rights advocacy group and think tank based in Washington, D.C., United States, with a branch in Austin, Texas.

Lobbying efforts
Public Citizen advocates before all three branches of the United States federal government. Its five divisions include: Congress Watch; Energy; Global Trade Watch; the Health Research Group; and Public Citizen Litigation Group, a nationally prominent public interest law firm founded by Alan Morrison and known for its Supreme Court and appellate practice.

Broadly speaking, Public Citizen favors robust corporate accountability and strong government regulation, particularly in the areas of transport, healthcare, and nuclear power.  The organization's priorities range from campaign finance reform to drug and auto safety and financial reform.  The unifying theme is an effort to curb the impact of corporate power on American democracy.

For example, Public Citizen has been a public voice on matters related to drug policy and pricing, exemplified by advocacy surrounding Gilead Sciences and remdesivir, and the potentially cheaper alternative GS-441524.

Organization and history
Founded by Ralph Nader in 1971,  Public Citizen is funded by dues and contributions from its members and supporters, foundation grants, and publication sales and does not accept government or corporate funds.

Disassociation from Ralph Nader
In the aftermath of Ralph Nader's 2000 presidential campaign, Public Citizen disassociated itself from its founder.
Progressive magazine Mother Jones wrote about the so-called "rank-and-file liberals” who faulted Nader's U.S. presidential run in 2000 for taking votes away from Al Gore, thus ensuring George W. Bush’s victory.
Mother Jones also pointed out that Nader’s association with Public Citizen was causing fundraising problems. Mother Jones cited a letter by Public Citizen to its readership with the disclaimer: "Although Ralph Nader was our founder, he has not held an official position in the organization since 1980 and does not serve on the board. Public Citizen—and the other groups that Mr. Nader founded—act independently."

People associated with Public Citizen
Ralph Nader, founder
Joan Claybrook, first Executive Director
Donna Edwards, former U.S. Representative
Robert Weissman, Executive Director
Alan Morrison, Co-Founder of Litigation Group.
Mark J. Green, former New York City Public Advocate
Lori Wallach, Director, Global Trade Watch
Sidney M. Wolfe, Director, Health Research Group
Phil Radford, Former Organizer, Global Trade Watch; currently democracy, clean energy and environmental leader
Wenonah Hauter, Executive Director, Food and Water Watch
Lisa Gilbert, Congress Watch Director

See also
 Consumer Project on Technology
 Food & Water Watch
 Anti-nuclear movement in the United States
 Tasimelteon

References

External links
Public Citizen Website

 
Dupont Circle
Government watchdog groups in the United States
Political advocacy groups in the United States
Organizations established in 1971
Ralph Nader
Progressive organizations in the United States